Dosburg Online is the thirty-third album by Klaus Schulze. It was originally released in 1997, and in 2006 was the twenty-first Schulze album reissued by Revisited Records. Dosburg Online was released after Schulze's Silver Edition and Historic Edition 10-disc CD box sets, as well as Jubilee Edition 25-disc CD box set, technically making this album his seventy-eighth. This is the second of two reissues not to feature a bonus track (the other being Miditerranean Pads).

Track listing
All tracks composed by Klaus Schulze, except where noted.

Personnel
Klaus Schulze – keyboards, drum machine, sequencers
Jorg Schaaf – keyboards, sequencers
Roelof Oostwoud – operatic vocals

External links
 Dosburg Online at the official site of Klaus Schulze
 

Klaus Schulze albums
1997 albums